Hinckley Town F.C. was an English association football club based in Hinckley, England.

History
The club was the first from the town of Hinckley, being formed in the 19th century, playing their games at the Holywell Ground. They played in the Leicestershire Senior League and Midland League before dissolving in 1906.

The club was re-formed in 1972 and subsequently played in the FA Cup, FA Trophy and FA Vase.

In 1997 they merged with Hinckley Athletic to form Hinckley United.

References

Defunct football clubs in England
Central Midlands Football League
Defunct football clubs in Leicestershire
Hinckley
Association football clubs disestablished in 1997
Association football clubs established in the 19th century
Midland Football League (1889)
Leicestershire Senior League